The 2001 Big Ten softball tournament was held at Alumni Field on the campus of the University of Michigan in Ann Arbor, Michigan.  As the tournament winner, Iowa earned the Big Ten Conference's automatic bid to the 2001 NCAA Division I softball tournament.

Format and seeding
The 2001 tournament was a six team double-elimination tournament. The top six teams based on conference regular season winning percentage earned invites to the tournament.  This was the first tournament that Illinois participated in, as it was also the first season for the Illinois softball team competing at the varsity level in the Big Ten.

Tournament

References

Big Ten softball tournament
Tournament
Big Ten softball tournament